OSDV may refer to:

Open Source Digital Voting Foundation, a US non-profit organization
Oat sterile dwarf virus, a plant pathogenic virus